The United States Government Accountability Office reported more than 150 incidents from 2001 to 2006 of nuclear plants not performing within acceptable safety guidelines. According to a 2010 survey of energy accidents, there have been at least 56 accidents at nuclear reactors in the United States (defined as incidents that either resulted in the loss of human life or more than US$50,000 of property damage). The most serious of these  was the Three Mile Island accident in 1979. Davis-Besse Nuclear Power Plant has been the source of two of the top five most dangerous nuclear incidents in the United States since 1979. Relatively few accidents have involved fatalities.

Context
Globally, there have been at least 99 (civilian and military) recorded nuclear reactor accidents from 1952 to 2009 (defined as incidents that either resulted in the loss of human life or more than US$50,000 of property damage, the amount the US federal government uses to define major energy accidents that must be reported), totaling US$20.5 billion in property damages. The accidents involved meltdowns, explosions, fires, and loss of coolant, and occurred during both normal operation and extreme emergency conditions (such as droughts and earthquakes). Property damage costs include destruction of property, emergency response, environmental remediation, evacuation, lost product, fines, and court claims. Because nuclear reactors are large and complex, accidents onsite tend to be relatively expensive.

In the U.S., at least 56 nuclear reactor accidents have occurred. The most serious of these U.S. accidents was the Three Mile Island accident in 1979. According to the Nuclear Regulatory Commission, the Davis–Besse Nuclear Power Station has been the source of two of the top five most dangerous nuclear incidents in the United States since 1979.

The United States Government Accountability Office reported more than 150 incidents from 2001 to 2006 of nuclear plants not performing within acceptable safety guidelines. In 2006, it said: "Since 2001, the ROP has resulted in more than 4,000 inspection findings concerning nuclear power plant licensees' failure to fully comply with NRC regulations and industry standards for safe plant operation, and NRC has subjected more than 75 percent (79) of the 103 operating plants to increased oversight for varying periods".

History
The Atomic Energy Act of 1954 encouraged private corporations in the United States to build nuclear reactors and a significant learning phase followed with many early partial core meltdowns and accidents at experimental reactors and research facilities. This led to the introduction of the Price-Anderson Act in 1957, which was "an implicit admission that nuclear power provided risks that producers were unwilling to assume without federal backing".

Nuclear reactor accidents continued into the 1960s with a small test reactor exploding at the Stationary Low-Power Reactor Number One in Idaho Falls in January 1961 resulting in three deaths which were the first fatalities in the history of U.S. nuclear reactor operations. There was also a partial meltdown at the Enrico Fermi Nuclear Generating Station in Michigan in 1966.

The large size of nuclear reactors ordered during the late 1960s raised new safety questions and created fears of a severe reactor accident that would send large quantities of radiation into the environment.  In the early 1970s, a highly contentious debate over the performance of emergency core cooling systems in nuclear plants, designed to prevent a core meltdown that could lead to the "China syndrome", received coverage in the popular media and technical journals.

In 1976, four nuclear engineers —three from GE and one from the Nuclear Regulatory Commission— resigned, stating that nuclear power was not as safe as their superiors were claiming. They testified to the Joint Committee on Atomic Energy that: 
"the cumulative effect of all design defects and deficiencies in the design, construction and operations of nuclear power plants makes a nuclear power plant accident, in our opinion, a certain event.  The only question is when, and where.

Three Mile Island accident

On March 28, 1979, equipment failures and operator error contributed to loss of coolant and a partial core meltdown of Unit 2's pressurized water reactor at the Three Mile Island Nuclear Power Plant in Pennsylvania. The scope and complexity of this reactor accident became clear over the course of five days, as a number of agencies at the local, state and federal levels tried to solve the problem and decide whether the ongoing accident required an emergency evacuation, and to what extent.

Cleanup started in August 1979 and officially ended in December 1993, with a total cleanup cost of about $1 billion. In his 2007 preliminary assessment of major energy accidents, Benjamin K. Sovacool, estimated that the TMI accident caused a total of $2.4 billion in property damages. The health effects of the Three Mile Island accident are widely, but not universally, agreed to be very low level.

The TMI accident forced regulatory and operational improvements on a reluctant industry, but it also increased opposition to nuclear power. The accident triggered protests around the world.

List of accidents and incidents

Nuclear safety

Nuclear safety in the U.S. is governed by federal regulations issued by the Nuclear Regulatory Commission (NRC). The NRC regulates all nuclear plants and materials in the U.S. except for of nuclear plants and materials controlled by the U.S. government, as well those powering naval vessels.

The 1979 Three Mile Island accident was a pivotal event that led to questions about U.S. nuclear safety. Earlier events had a similar effect, including a 1975 fire at Browns Ferry, the 1976 testimonials of three concerned GE nuclear engineers, the GE Three. In 1981, workers inadvertently reversed pipe restraints at the Diablo Canyon Power Plant reactors, compromising seismic protection systems, which further undermined confidence in nuclear safety. All of these well-publicised events undermined public support for the U.S. nuclear industry in the 1970s and the 1980s.

Recent concerns have been expressed about the safety of nuclear reactors. In 2012, the Union of Concerned Scientists, which tracks ongoing safety issues at operating nuclear plants, found that "leakage of radioactive materials is a pervasive problem at almost 90 percent of all reactors, as are issues that pose a risk of nuclear accidents".

Following the Japanese Fukushima Daiichi nuclear disaster, according to Black & Veatch's annual utility survey that took place after the disaster, of the 700 executives from the US electric utility industry that were surveyed, nuclear safety was the top concern. There are likely to be increased requirements for on-site spent fuel management and elevated design basis threats at nuclear power plants. License extensions for existing reactors will face additional scrutiny, with outcomes depending on the degree to which plants can meet new requirements, and  some of the extensions already granted for more than 60 of the 104 operating U.S. reactors could be revisited. On-site storage, consolidated long-term storage, and geological disposal of spent fuel is "likely to be reevaluated in a new light because of the Fukushima storage pool experience".

In October 2011, the Nuclear Regulatory Commission instructed agency staff to move forward with seven of the 12 safety recommendations put forward by the federal task force in July. The recommendations include "new standards aimed at strengthening operators' ability to deal with a complete loss of power, ensuring plants can withstand floods and earthquakes and improving emergency response capabilities". The new safety standards will take up to five years to fully implement.

See also
Nuclear power accidents by country
Nuclear and radiation accidents by country
Lists of nuclear disasters and radioactive incidents
List of canceled nuclear plants in the United States
Nuclear safety

References

Further reading
Conservation Fallout: Nuclear Protest at Diablo Canyon (2006)
Contesting the Future of Nuclear Power (2011)
Essence of Decision: Explaining the Cuban Missile Crisis (1971)
Fallout: An American Nuclear Tragedy (2004)
Fukushima: Japan's Tsunami and the Inside Story of the Nuclear Meltdowns (2013)Full Body Burden: Growing Up in the Nuclear Shadow of Rocky Flats (2012)Killing Our Own: The Disaster of America's Experience with Atomic Radiation (1982)In Mortal Hands: A Cautionary History of the Nuclear Age (2009)Making a Real Killing: Rocky Flats and the Nuclear West (1999)Non-Nuclear Futures: The Case for an Ethical Energy Strategy (1975)Normal Accidents: Living with High-Risk Technologies (1984) Nuclear Politics in America (1997)Nuclear Terrorism: The Ultimate Preventable Catastrophe (2004)
 Nuclear War Survival Skills (1979)Nuclear Weapons: The Road to Zero (1998)The Making of the Atomic Bomb (1987)Nukespeak: Nuclear Language, Visions and Mindset (1982)On Nuclear Terrorism (2007)Plutopia'' (2013)

Nuclear history of the United States
Accid